This is an alphabetical list of villages in West Godavari district, Andhra Pradesh, India.

A 

 Achanta
 Achanta Vemavaram
 Agadallanka
 Agarru
 Ajjamuru
 Akividu
 Akkireddigudem
 Allipalle
 Amberpeta
 Amrutalingampeta
 Amudalachalaka
 Anakoderu
 Ananthapalli
 Annavaram
 Aravalli
 Arjunudupalam
 Attili

B 

 Badampudi
 Ballipadu
 Ballipadu
 Ballipadu
 Bethapudi
 Bhimadole
 Bhimalapuram
 Bhogole
 Brahmanagudem
 Burugagudem
 Buttayagudem

C 

 Chagallu
 Chakrayagudem
 Challachintalapudi
 Challapalle
 Chataparru
 Chebrolu
 Cherukumilli
 Chettunnapadu
 Chidipi
 Chinakapavaram
 Chinamiram
 Chintalapudi
 Chintampalle
 Chintaparru
 Chodavaram

D–E 

 Daravaram
 Denduluru
 Devarapalle
 Devulapalle
 Dharmajigudem
 Dharmapuram
 Dharmavaram
 Digamarru
 Dirusumarru
 Doddipatla
 Dommeru
 Dondapadu
 Dorasanipadu
 Dosapadu
 Duddepudi
 Dumpagadapa
 Duvva
 Edulakunta
 Eduru
 Eletipadu
 Elurupadu
 Endapalli
 Epuru

G–J 

 Galayagudem
 Ganapavaram
 Garlamadugu
 Gogunta
 Gopalapuram
 Gopannapalem
 Goraganamudi
 Gudigunta
 Gudivakalanka
 Gummampadu
 Gummuluru
 Gundugolanu
 Gunnampalli
 Guntupalle
 Iragavaram
 Jagannadhapuram
 Jeelakarra Gudem
 Jeelugumilli

K 

 Kaikaram
 Kalakurru
 Kalaparru
 Kalavalapalli
 Kaldhari
 Kalipatnam
 Kalla
 Kamavarapukota
 Kanchumarru
 Kandaravalli
 Kantamanenivari Gudem
 Karugorumilli
 Kavuluru
 Kesavaram
 Khandavalli
 Kodamanchili
 Koderu
 Kodurupadu
 Kokkirailanka
 Kokkirapadu
 Kollaparru
 Kolleru
 Komarada
 Komatilanka
 Komirepalle
 Kommara
 Kommugudem
 Kondalaraopalem
 Konijerla
 Koniki
 Konithiwada
 Koppaka
 Kothagudem
 Kothapalle
 Kothota
 Kothuru
 Kovvada
 Kovvali
 Koyyalagudem
 Kukkunoor
 Kumaradevam
 Kumudavalli
 Kuppanapudi
 Kurukuru

L–M 

 Lakshminarayanapuram
 Lankalakoderu
 Lingapalem
 Madhavaram, Kukkunoor
 Madhavaram, Tadepalligudem
 Madivada
 Makkinavarigudem
 Malakacherla
 Malavanitippa
 Mallavaram
 Manchili
 Manuru
 Markundapadu
 Marteru
 Matsyapuri
 Medinaraopalem
 MM Puram
 Mogallu
 Mogalthur
 Mortha
 Mukkamala
 Mundur
 Mupparru
 Muppavaram

N 

 Nabipeta
 Nadipudi
 Naguladevunipadu
 Nallajerla
 Nandikeswarapuram
 Narasimhapuram
 Navuduru
 Nidamarru

P 

 Palakoderu
 Pali
 Pallantlai
 Paluru
 Pangidigudem
 Pattiseema
 Pedakadimi
 Pedakapavaram
 Pedamallam
 Pedapadu
 Pedapulleru
 Pedavegi
 Pennada Agraharam
 Pentapadu
 Penumanchili
 Penumantra
 Peravali
 Pinakadimi
 Pippara
 Poduru
 Polamuru
 Polasanipalle
 Polavaram
 Ponangi
 Pothavaram
 Pothunuru
 Pragadavaram
 Prakasaraopalem
 Prathikollanka
 Pulla
 Pydichintapadu

R–S 

 Rajampalem
 Rajupeta
 Rajupothepalle
 Ramaraogudem
 Ramasingavaram
 Rangapuram Khandrika
 Rayakuduru
 Rayannapalem
 Relangi
 Saanigudem
 Sakalakothapalle
 Saripalle
 Satyavolu
 Siddapuram
 Singarajupalem
 Singavaram
 Skinnerapuram
 Somavarappadu
 Sreeparru
 Sriramavaram
 Surappagudem

T–U 

 T. Narasapuram
 Tadepalle
 Tadikalapudi
 Tadiparru
 Tallagudem
 Tallamudi
 Tallapudi
 Taratava
 Thimmannagudem
 Thogummi
 Tirupatipuram
 Undi
 Undrajavaram
 Unguturu
 Unikili
 Uppugudem
 Usulumarru

V–Y 

 Vadali
 Valluru
 Vanguru
 Varighedu
 Vatluru
 Veeravasaram
 Vegavaram
 Vegivadavaram
 Velagadurru
 Velagalapalli
 Velerupadu
 Velivennu
 Velpuru
 Vempa
 Vempadu
 Vijayarai
 Yadavilli
 Yelamanchili
 Yernagudem
 Yerraicheruvu
 Yerramalla

West Godavari district